Gander is a surname. Notable people with the name include:

 Forrest Gander (born 1956), American poet, author, critic and translator
 Joe Gander (1888-1954), Australian politician
 L Marsland Gander (1902-1986), British journalist, war correspondent and radio and television correspondent
 Philippa Gander, New Zealand academic and sleep researcher